Tench is the debut EP by Shriekback, released in 1982. It spawned one single: "Sexthinkone".

Track listing
"Accretions"
"Moth Loop"
"Here Comes My Hand-Clap"
"Sexthinkone"
"A Kind of Fascination"
"All the Greek Boys (Do the Handwalk)"

This album was released on vinyl only. On some releases, the first three tracks listed here appear on Side A of the record whereas, on others, they appear on Side B.

2015 remastered edition
CD 1
"Sexthinkone" (3:39)
"A Kind of Fascination" (4:34) 
"All the Greek Boys (Do the Handwalk)" (4:13)
"Accretions" (4:28)
"Mothloop" (4:39)
"Here Comes My Hand:Clap" (3:17)
"Mount Pleasant Thrash" (2:42)
"So Hard So Hard" (3:05)
"Something Else" (featuring Danny Crilly) (3:05)
"Who's on Top" (featuring Emma Burnham) (2:48)
"Bricks and Whistles" (2:28)
"Floral Police Van" (3:41)
"Plunging into Homes" (2:46)
"Regret No Dogs" (3:05)
"Feelers" (Remix) (4:56)
"Accretions" (Remix) (4:29)

CD 2
"Sexthinkone" (Live in Detroit '83) (6:13)
"Sway" (Live in Detroit '83) (6:29)
"Brink of Collapse" (Live in Detroit '83) (5:02)
"Grapes into Lettuce" (Live in Detroit '83) (4:31)
"Considerable" (Live in Detroit '83) (4:43)
"Mothloop" (Live in Detroit '83) (3:57)
"A Kind of Fascination" (Live in Detroit '83) (4:45)
"Despite Dense Weed" (Live in Detroit '83) (7:14)
"My Spine (Is the Bassline)" (Live in Detroit '83) (5:04)
"Lined Up" (Live in Detroit '83) (6:24)

Personnel
Shriekback 
Barry Andrews - keyboards, synthesizers, vocals
Carl Marsh - guitars, vocals
Dave Allen - bass
Technical
Ian Caple - engineer, co-production

References

1982 debut EPs
Shriekback albums
Virgin Records EPs